Mugharet el-Zuttiyeh ("Cave of the Robbers") is a prehistoric archaeological site in Upper Galilee, Israel. It was found to house a fossil today known as the "Galilee skull" or "The Yabrudian Man".

History
Discovered in 1925, the skull was the first  fossilised archaic human found in Western Asia.
Today its taxonomy is that of Homo heidelbergensis.

The cave was excavated from 1925 to 1926 by Francis Turville-Petre. It was the first paleontological excavation in the region.  Turville-Petre discovered a skull, referred to as the Galilee Skull, that was initially described as the second Neanderthal-like specimen. It was originally attributed to a Mousterian stratum and is now thought to be from an earlier Acheulo-Yabrudian complex. Later studies showed that the face was relatively flat, with no evidence of Neanderthal-like facial prognathism.

The frontal bone and part of the upper face were found in the Mugharan level, which leads to an estimate of the age of the fossil to range from 200 to 500 kya.
Similarities with Zhoukoudian remains suggest a possible ancestral relationship.

The skull is housed in the Rockefeller Museum in East Jerusalem  along with many other findings of Turville-Petre/  A cast of the skull is on display at the Israel Museum.

See also
Archaeology of Israel
List of human evolution fossils
Qesem Cave
Skhul and Qafzeh hominids

References

Further reading

External links
What does it mean to be human?

Prehistoric sites in Israel
Upper Galilee